Paradise Guerrilla is a Brazilian pop music band formed in São Paulo in 2022. The current lineup consists of Starlight, U.F.O., and Frankstation.

Marked by the use of alien-referenced costumes by two members and the pop presence of its frontwoman, the band draws strong influences from sci-fi, the gaming universe, and comic book culture in its videos and performances. Its pop sound blends electronic elements with the use of analog instruments such as Moog synthesizers and drum machines, bass and guitar. Its compositions deal with themes such as extraterrestrial life and human relationships.

Their debut single "Another Galaxy" was among the 50 most played songs on Brazilian radio in 2022, and its music video was nominated in two categories at the 2022 Music Video Festival Awards.

Members 

 Starlight - lead vocal, musical production
 U.F.O. - electric guitar, synthesizer, musical production
 Frankstation - electric bass, synthesizer, musical production

Discography

Singles 

 Another Galaxy (2022)
 Escape feat. Tsukiyomi (2022)
 Through The Lights (2022)

EPs 

 Another Galaxy EP (2022)
 Escape EP (2022)

Awards and nominations 
Music Video Festival Awards

2022

 Nominated in the categories: "Best narrative in music video - Jury's choice" and "Special effects in music video - Jury's choice"

References

External links 
 Paradise Guerrilla on Spotify
 Paradise Guerrilla on YouTube

Bands with fictional stage personas
Brazilian electronic music groups
Brazilian pop music groups
Masked musicians
Musical groups established in 2022